
Gmina Kobiele Wielkie is a rural gmina (administrative district) in Radomsko County, Łódź Voivodeship, in central Poland.

Villages
Gmina Kobiele Wielkie contains the villages and settlements of Babczów, Biestrzyków Mały, Biestrzyków Wielki, Brzezinki, Bukienka, Cadów, Cadówek, Cieszątki, Dudki, Gorgoń, Hucisko Małokobielskie, Hucisko Przybyszowskie, Huta Drewniana, Huta Drewniana-Kolonia, Jasień, Kamionka, Karsy, Katarzynów, Kobiele Małe, Kobiele Małe-Kolonia, Kobiele Wielkie, Łazy, Łowicz, Nadrożne, Nowy Widok, Olszynki, Orzechów, Orzechówek, Podświerk, Posadówka, Przyborów, Przybyszów, Przydatki Przybyszowskie, Rozpęd, Stary Widok, Świerczyny, Ujazdówek, Wola Rożkowa, Wrony, Wymysłów and Zrąbiec.

Neighbouring gminas
Gmina Kobiele Wielkie is bordered by the gminas of Gidle, Kodrąb, Masłowice, Radomsko, Wielgomłyny and Żytno.

References
Polish official population figures 2006

Kobiele Wielkie
Radomsko County